Philippe Gaulier (born in Paris, 4 March 1943) is a French master clown, pedagogue, and professor of theatre. He is the founder of École Philippe Gaulier, a prestigious French theatre school in Étampes, outside Paris. He studied under Jacques Lecoq in the mid-1960s and was an instructor at L'École Internationale de Théâtre Jacques Lecoq in the late 1970s. As well as performing as a clown, he is also a playwright and director. He has published The Tormentor (Le Gégèneur), a book discussing his thoughts on the theatre and containing exercises designed to develop an actor's skill.

Gaulier is known for performing both clown and bouffon comic genres and is thought by some to be the world's leading authority on the "Bouffon", a comic genre he holds as a sort of inverted Clown, where a balance is struck between grotesqueness and charm.

Approach to training 
Gaulier's methodology of teaching is designed to allow the student to develop their own beauty and the pleasure of being on stage. For example, with the clown, he helps students uncover their own clown. There are philosophical principles involved, but his training is not mired in technicalities. "I don't teach a special style; what I teach more is a wonderful spirit. People have to develop a way of being beautiful and surprising." By beauty he means "anyone in the grip of pleasure or freedom".

In this, his approach notably differs from that of his teacher, the famous late master 'bouffon' Jacques Lecoq, who some criticised as being overly doctrinaire. "You can always tell a Lecoq student," Gaulier states. "Too much emphasis on image."

Philippe Gaulier's way into acting (i.e. he also teaches Shakespeare, Chekhov, melodrama, farce) is also thoroughly grounded in the principle of Le Jeu (the game).

École Philippe Gaulier

Founded in 1980, the École Philippe Gaulier is a theatre workshop based around play or 'Le Jeu' being the core of making and performing theatre. It promotes the theory that acting is a child's game played with great pleasure and dexterity that forms a rapport with the audience by speaking to their imagination.

In 1991, the Arts Council England persuaded Gaulier to move the École Philippe Gaulier to the United Kingdom, where it was based for eleven years until 2002. In 2005, it reopened back in Sceaux, Hauts-de-Seine, until 2011, when it moved again, this time to Étampes, where it opened in summer 2011. Organised by Small Nose Productions, Philippe returns to the UK once a year to runs workshops at Trestle Arts Base in St Albans, Herts.

Sacha Baron Cohen, Emma Thompson, Helena Bonham Carter, Roberto Benigni and Simon McBurney number among his students.

See also
Comedic genres
Clown
Clown College
Circus Clowns
Rodeo clown
Mime
Flatulist
Physical theatre
Slapstick
Jacques Lecoq
Le Pétomane
Jerry Lewis

Sources
Theatre school Philippe Gaulier
Universitat Der Kunste Berlin - Philippe Gaulier

References

External links
École Philippe Gaulier website
Lucy Amsden's University of Glasgow Phd thesis on learning clown at École Philippe Gaulier

1943 births
Living people
French clowns
Physical theatre
L'École Internationale de Théâtre Jacques Lecoq alumni